Chapak-e Shafi Mahalleh (also Romanized as Chapak-e Shafī‘ Maḩalleh and Chepak-e Shafī‘ Maḩalleh) is a village in Gafsheh-ye Lasht-e Nesha Rural District, Lasht-e Nesha District, Rasht County, Gilan Province, Iran. At the 2006 census, its population was 271, in 94 families.

References 

Populated places in Rasht County